Lorentz invariance measures the universal features in hypothetical loop quantum gravity universes. The various hypothetical multiverse loop quantum gravity universe design models could have various general covariant principle results.

Because loop quantum gravity models universes, space gravity theories are contenders to build and answer unification theory;  the Lorentz invariance helps grade the spread of universal features throughout a proposed multiverse in time.

Grand Unification Epoch
The Grand Unification Epoch is the era in time in the chronology of the universe where no elementary particles existed, and the three gauge interactions of the Standard Model which define the electromagnetic, weak, and strong interactions or forces, are merged into one single force. Convention says that 3 minutes after the Big Bang, protons and neutrons began to come together to form the nuclei of simple elements.  Whereas, loop quantum gravity theories place the origin and the age of elementary particles and the age of Lorentz invariance, beyond 13.799 ± 0.021 billion years ago.

The permanence of our Lorentz invariance constants is based on elementary particles and their features.   There are eons of time before the Big Bang to build the universe from black holes and older multiverses.  There is a selective process that creates features in elementary particles, like accept, store and give energy.  In the books of Lee Smolin about loop quantum gravity, this theory contains the evolutionary ideas of "reproduction" and "mutation" of universes, and elementary particles, so is formally analogous to models of population biology.

Earlier universes
In the early universes before the Big Bang, there are theories that loop quantum gravity loop quantum structures formed space.  The Lorentz invariance and universal constants describe elementary particles that do not exist yet.

Fecund universes is a multiverse theory by Lee Smolin about the role of black holes.  The theory has black holes and loop quantum gravity connecting early universes together.   Loop quantum gravity can be pulled into black holes. In Fecund universes, each new universe, according to Lee Smolin, has slightly different laws of physics. Because these laws are only slightly different, each is assumed to be like a mutation of the early universes.

Minkowski spacetime
Loop quantum gravity (LQG) is a quantization of a classical Lagrangian classical field theory. It is equivalent to the usual Einstein–Cartan theory in that it leads to the same equations of motion describing general relativity with torsion. As such, it can be argued that LQG respects local Lorentz invariance.

Global Lorentz invariance is broken in LQG just like it is broken in general relativity (unless one is dealing with Minkowski spacetime, which is one particular solution of the Einstein field equations). On the other hand, there has been much talk about possible local and global violations of Lorentz invariance beyond those expected in straightforward general relativity.

Of interest in this connection would be to see whether the LQG analogue of Minkowski spacetime breaks or preserves global Lorentz invariance, and Carlo Rovelli and coworkers have recently been investigating the Minkowski state of LQG using spin foam techniques.  These questions will all remain open as long as the classical limits of various LQG models (see below for the sources of variation) cannot be calculated.

Lie algebras and loop quantum gravity
Mathematically LQG is local gauge theory of the self-dual subgroup of the complexified Lorentz group, which is related to the action of the Lorentz group on Weyl spinors commonly used in elementary particle physics. This is partly a matter of mathematical convenience, as it results in a compact group SO(3) or SU(2) as gauge group, as opposed to the non-compact groups SO(3,1) or SL(2.C). The compactness of the Lie group avoids some thus-far unsolved difficulties in the quantization of gauge theories of noncompact lie groups, and is responsible for the discreteness of the area and volume spectra. The theory involving the Immirzi parameter is necessary to resolve an ambiguity in the process of complexification. These are some of the many ways in which different quantizations of the same classical theory can result in inequivalent quantum theories, or even in the impossibility to carry quantization through.

One can't distinguish between SO(3) and SU(2) or between SO(3,1) and SL(2,C) at this level: the respective Lie algebras are the same. In fact, all four groups have the same complexified Lie algebra, which makes matters even more confusing (these subtleties are usually ignored in elementary particle physics). The physical interpretation of the Lie algebra is that of infinitesimally small group transformations, and gauge bosons (such as the graviton) are Lie algebra representations, not Lie group representations. What this means for the Lorentz group is that, for sufficiently small velocity parameters, all four complexified Lie groups are indistinguishable in the absence of matter fields.

To make matters more complicated, it can be shown that a positive cosmological constant can be realized in LQG by replacing the Lorentz group with the corresponding quantum group. At the level of the Lie algebra, this corresponds to what is called q-deforming the Lie algebra, and the parameter q is related to the value of the cosmological constant. The effect of replacing a Lie algebra by a q-deformed version is that the series of its representations is truncated (in the case of the rotation group, instead of having representations labelled by all half-integral spins, one is left with all representations with total spin j less than some constant).

It is entirely possible to formulate LQG in terms of q-deformed Lie algebras instead of ordinary Lie algebras, and in the case of the Lorentz group the result would, again, be indistinguishable for sufficiently small velocity parameters.

Spin networks loop quantum gravity
In the spin-foam formalism, the Barrett–Crane model, which was for a while the most promising state-sum model of 4D Lorentzian quantum gravity, was based on representations of the noncompact groups SO(3,1) or SL(2,C), so the spin foam faces (and hence the spin network edges) were labelled by positive real numbers as opposed to the half-integer labels of SU(2) spin networks.

These and other considerations, including difficulties interpreting what it would mean to apply a Lorentz transformation to a spin network state, led Lee Smolin and others to suggest that spin network states must break Lorentz invariance. Lee Smolin and Joao Magueijo then went on to study doubly special relativity, in which not only there is a constant velocity c but also a constant distance l. They showed that there are nonlinear representations of the Lorentz Lie algebra with these properties (the usual Lorentz group being obtained from a linear representation). Doubly special relativity predicts deviations from the special relativity dispersion relation  at large energies (corresponding to small wavelengths of the order of the constant length l in the doubly special theory). Giovanni Amelino-Camelia then proposed that the mystery of ultra-high-energy cosmic rays might be solved by assuming such violations of the special-relativity dispersion relation for photons.

Phenomenological (hence, not specific to LQG) constraints on anomalous dispersion relations can be obtained by considering a variety of astrophysical experimental data, of which high-energy cosmic rays are but one part. Current observations are already able to place exceedingly stringent constraints on these phenomenological parameters.

References

Loop quantum gravity